Stoned Soul Picnic is the third album by American pop group The 5th Dimension, released in 1968 (see 1968 in music). Early versions of the album had a lyric sheet inserted in the sleeve.

Stoned Soul Picnic was the third and final album by the group to be issued in both mono (SCM 91002) and stereo (SCS 92002) as monaural albums were being phased out during its release in 1968.  As a result, mono copies were pressed in a limited quantity and are considered rare in the collectors market.

Track listing

Side 1
"Sweet Blindness" (Laura Nyro) – 3:27
"It'll Never Be the Same Again" (Jeff Comanor) – 3:08
"The Sailboat Song" (Jeff Comanor) – 2:52
"It's a Great Life" (Denny McReynolds, Karen O'Hara) – 3:08
"Stoned Soul Picnic" (Laura Nyro) – 3:30

Side 2
"California Soul" (Nickolas Ashford, Valerie Simpson) – 3:16
"Lovin' Stew" (Jules Alexander, Jeff Comanor) – 2:51
"Broken Wing Bird" (Bob Alcivar, Kellie McKinney) – 2:41
"Good News" (Dick Addrisi, Don Addrisi) – 2:37
"Bobbie's Blues (Who Do You Think of?)" (Jeff Comanor) – 3:18
"The Eleventh Song (What a Groovy Day!)" (Jimmy Webb) – 2:26

Previously unreleased bonus track on CD
"East of Java" (Frank Unzueta) – 3:06

Personnel
Billy Davis Jr. 
Florence LaRue 
Marilyn McCoo  
Lamonte McLemore 
Ron Townson

Additional personnel
Mike Deasy - acoustic guitar, electric guitar
Tommy Tedesco - acoustic guitar, electric guitar
Joe Osborn - bass
Ray Pohlman - guitar, "super-twang" bass
Hal Blaine - drums, percussion
Larry Bunker - marimba, bells, vibraphone, temple blocks, percussion
Larry Knechtel - piano, organ, keyboard
Jimmy Rowles - piano, organ, keyboard
The Sid Sharp Strings - String Section
The Bill Holman Brass - Horn Section

Production
Producer: Bones Howe
Engineers: Captain Nemo (Michael Shields), Bones Howe, Alex Kazanegras, Phil Ramone, Joe Sidore, Sol Weiss, Winston Wong, Mary Wood
Mastering: Elliot Federman
Reissue producer: Rob Santos
Digital transfers: Mike Hartry
Project coordination: Arlessa Barnes, Glenn Delgado, Christina DeSimone, Robin Diamond, Karyn Friedland, Felicia Gearhart, Marc Gordon, Laura Gregory, Jeremy Holiday, Robin Manning, Brooke Nochomson, Ed Osborne, Larry Parra, Dana Renert, Steve Strauss
Product manager: Mandana Eidgah
Production assistant: Bones Howe, Tom Tierney, Russ Wapensky
Orchestra manager: Hal Blaine
Musical director: René DeKnight
Vocal coach: Ray Pohlman
Realization: Johnny Rivers
Horns & Strings arranged by: Bill Holman
Vocal arrangements: Bob Alcivar
Musical arrangements: Bones Howe
Musical arrangements: Ray Pohlman
Art direction: Woody Woodward
Reissue art direction: Mathieu Britton
Graphic design: Wayne Kimbell
Reissue design: Mathieu Britton
Photography: Rob Santos
Liner notes: Mike Ragogna

Charts
Album - Billboard (United States)

Singles - Billboard (United States)

References

The 5th Dimension albums
1968 albums
Albums produced by Bones Howe
Soul City Records (American label) albums
Albums recorded at United Western Recorders